The 1979 Chilean telethon was the second version of the solidarity campaign held in Chile, which took place on November 30th and December 1st, 1979. The theme of this version was "Let's repeat the unbelievable." The symbolic girl was Valeria Arias.

It was performed at the Teatro Casino Las Vegas (as was the First Telethon). This time, the goal was to surpass the total in the previous Telethon, and that money would serve to continue building the Teletón's rehabilitation institutes in Santiago, Antofagasta, Valparaiso and Concepcion.

At 21:35 the target was passed with the total of: CL$ 85,427,324. Over the whole event a total of CL$138,728,450 was raised.

Sponsors

Transmission 
 12.10.3.8 TVUN Red del Norte
 4.5.8 Red UCV Televisión
 Televisión Nacional de Chile
 Teleonce (Universidad de Chile)
 Corporación de Televisión Universidad Católica de Chile

Artists

References

External links 
 Images of the Second Telethon

Telethon
Chilean telethons